"Hold On Tight" was the third single from British singer Samantha Fox's 1986 debut album Touch Me.

Song information
"Hold On Tight" is a classically styled rock and roll song. The late 1980s saw a renewed interest in retro-1950s pop culture, in part spurred on by the film Back to the Future. "Hold On Tight's" electric guitar and backbeat serve to evoke a 1950s rock and  roll sound.

Music video
The music video reflects the song's rockabilly sensibilities by showing Samantha Fox in a diner sporting a ponytail, midriff-baring shirt, denim hot pants, and cowgirl boots. Soon after putting her song on the diner's jukebox she headed outside, this time wearing a fringe trimmed red leather dress. As she sings "Hold On Tight" Fox danced with greasers and youths in letterman jackets and poodle skirts, typical of 1950s fashion.

Critical reception
Lucy O'Brien in review of 30 August 1986 for New Musical Express left negative overlook of the song and a video by saying that Samantha Fox "aping Susie Quatro with derivative R&R crap". She concluded: "It's not even worth a laugh on Wogan".

Track listings
 Vinyl, 7" UK (FOXY 3)
"Hold On Tight" (3:34)
"It's Only Love" (3:36)

 Vinyl, 12", Picture Disc UK (FOXY S 3)
"Hold On Tight (Extended Version)" (5:06)
"Hold On Tight (Instrumental Version)" (3:36)
"Touch Me (I Want Your Body) (Blue Mix)" (5:49)
"It's Only Love" (3:34)

Charts

References

Samantha Fox songs
1986 singles
1986 songs
Jive Records singles